Cribrarula esontropia is a species of sea snail, a cowry, a marine gastropod mollusk in the family Cypraeidae, the cowries.

Subspecies
There are three subspecies recognized :
Cribrarula esontropia cribellum (Gaskoin, 1849)
Cribrarula esontropia esontropia (Duclos, 1833)
Cribrarula esontropia francescoi (Lorenz, 2002)

Description

Distribution
This species is found in the Indian Ocean off Mauritius and the Mascarene Basin.

References

 Lorenz, F., 2002. New worldwide cowries. Descriptions of new taxa and revisions of selected groups of living Cypraeidae (Mollusca: Gastropoda). Schriften zur Malakozoologie 20: 292 pp

External links

Cypraeidae
Gastropods described in 1833